Cyril White may refer to:

 Brudenell White (Cyril Brudenell Bingham White, 1876–1940), Australian general
 Cyril White (advocate) (Cyril Charles William White, 1909–1984), New Zealand musician and advocate for the blind
 Cyril White (cricketer) (1909-1987), South African cricketer
 Cyril Tenison White (1890–1950), Australian botanist "C.T.White"